South Carolina Highway 68 (SC 68) is a  state highway in Hampton County, in the U.S. state of South Carolina. It connects the Hampton–Varnille area with Yemassee and Interstate 95 (I-95).

Route description

The route of SC 68 travels generally in a northwest to southeast direction, beginning at a junction with U.S. Highway 278 (US 278 just south of Varnville. The highway travels in a nearly straight line for its entire length, paralleling the Port Royal and Augusta Railway (today the CSX Augusta Subdivision). Passing underneath I-95, SC 68 returns to a two-lane configuration as it enters Yemassee before terminating at an intersection with US 17 Alternate and US 21.

History
Established in 1967 as a renumbering of SC 28, it has remained unchanged since.

Prior to the current routing, SC 68 had two previous incarnations:

From 1934 or 1935 to 1938 from near Clio to the North Carolina state line (renumbered as SC 83)

From 1938 to 1947 as a short highway spur from SC 6 in Denmark to Voorhees College.

Junction list

See also

References

External links

068
Transportation in Hampton County, South Carolina